The surname Traill (also Trail,  Traille,  Traillie,  Traily, etc.) Is derived from Norse to at least Norman via France (is not of French 'origin', 'origin' is the wrong word to use here, the first written records of it come from France via Normandy, its origin is Norse via Normandy at least), it does also seem to have some relation to words from the northern UK, pointing again to where it is derived from. It became "Traill" in Scotland (show any 'modern' non Scottish spread) and thence spread around the world.

The family is recorded in France from the 10th century, as Barons in Britain from the 11th century, as Lairds in Scotland from the 14th century and later in Orkney.
In the 17th century they were prominent in Northern Ireland and also spread to various parts of the United States including the Cajun community.
Other branches of the family settled in Argentina in the 19th century, and in the British Colonies.

France 
The name is French. Goidfrid de Traillie came to England and held land in Bedford and on the Scottish border, both under William the Conqueror.
The Traills held land at Trelly in France and later in Bordeaux. Before 1391, Sir John Trailly was appointed Mayor of Bordeaux. Some Traills still reside in France.

The similarity to the name Tyrell raises the question whether the families are related, but the Tyrell family are descended from the family of the Count de Poix, of which the senior branch remained in France in the area known as Picardy. There is no known relationship between the two families in England: the Tyrells held land in the South in Devon and Somerset, unlike Goidfrid de Trailli (see above).

Scotland 
The family started to leave England for Scotland and France after the death of Sir John Treyl in 1360, although his son John did return for periods and served as a member of the House of Commons of England. A few years before this Sir John's death in 1401, his son Reginald returned from Bordeaux and had sold up the English estates by his own death in 1404. Earlier in approximately 1385, Sir John's brother, Walter Treyl, Bishop of St Andrews, bought Blebo from the Church and later willed it to his nephew, Thomas.

William Dunbar in his Lament for the Makaris writes "He hes Blind Harry and Sandy Traill / Slaine with his schour of mortall haill / Whilk Patrik Johnestoun myght nocht fle", citing him among a roll call of poets chiefly from the fifteenth century, but nothing else is known of Sandy Traill and no works have been traced.

Robert Traill of Greyfriars was born in 1603. He was son of Colonel James Traill, of Killcleary, Ireland, Gentleman of the Privy Chamber to Henry, Prince of Wales, and grandson of the Laird of Blebo, and Matilda Melvill of Carnbee. He graduated with an M.A. from St Andrews on 21 July 1621. He later studied at the Protestant College of Saumur. He was an English tutor in France to the sister of the Duke of Rohan in 1628.

Blebo, a large rural property, was subdivided in 1609 by the Laird of the period, John Traill, in agreement with his eldest son in order to help his younger brother Thomas. The smaller portion became known as Blebo Hole.  In the 16th century another brother of the same family, George Traill, migrated to Orkney, Scotland and thence to Co. Antrim, Ireland, now Northern Ireland.

In 1722, lead and silver were discovered on the Blebo property.  The area around the estate (Blebo Hole) is currently known as the community of Blebo Craigs. In Central Fife, Blebo lies three miles (five km) east of Cupar and comprises the village of Blebo Craigs, located a quarter-mile (0.4 km) northeast of Blebo House, together with the farms of Milton of Blebo, Blebo Mains, and Newbigging of Blebo. Kemback lies a quarter-mile (0.4 km) to the northwest and Pitscottie a half-mile (0.8 km) to the southwest.

A group of Trails came from Birsay on Orkney including Samuel Trail and his son James W. H. Trail. Thomas Stewart Traill was from Kirkwall.

Ireland 
In the 18th/19th century the Reverend Anthony Traill (1745–1852) was Rector of Skull and Archdeacon of the Diocese of Connor.

His son, the Reverend Robert Traill (1793–1847) was also Rector of Skull during the Great Famine and tried to alleviate the lot of the poor and to draw attention to their plight. He was also the first Irish translator of The Jewish War of Flavius Josephus. His story was featured on TV in Victoria Series 2 Episode 6, which dealt with the impact on the Queen of the Famine, her correspondence and meeting with the Reverend.

In 1904 Anthony Traill (1838–1914) was appointed provost (i.e. head) of Trinity College, Dublin.

William Atcheson Traill (1844–1933) was an Irish engineer and co-founder of the Giant's Causeway Railway and Tramway Company, opened in 1887.

United States 
In the mid 17th century, Trails acquired and settled land in the North America, in Massachusetts and in Maryland. The Maryland area, New Scotland Hundred, eventually became the city of Washington DC.  The Maryland Trails also held estates in what are now Montgomery County and Frederick County. The name also spread to Louisiana, Alabama, and other parts of the southern United States.
The name "Traille" is recorded in the Cajun community in the southern United States.

Later dispersion 
In the 19th century the sons of Robert Traill settled in Argentina, where his grandson Johnny Traill became the first Irish-Argentine 10-goal polo player.
Other branches of the family settled in Australia, Canada and New Zealand.

In literature 
The book Silver River by Daisy Goodwin gives a partly fictionalised account of the fortunes of her branch of the Traill family from her great-great-great-grandfather, Rector Robert Traill of Skull during the Great Famine of Ireland via their emigration to Argentina to herself in an attempt to understand her relationship with her mother, Jocasta Innes.

People with the surname Traill
 Anthony Traill (college provost) (1838–1914), provost of Trinity College Dublin
 Anthony Traill (linguist) (1939–2007), South African linguist
 Anthony Traill (college provost) (1838–1914), provost of Trinity College Dublin
 Anthony Traill (priest) (1755–1831), rector of Skull and Archdeacon of Connor 
 Barry Traill (fl. 2000s), Australian zoologist and conservationist
 Catharine Parr Traill (1802–1899), English-Canadian author and naturalist
 Elsie Traill (1876–1946), Australian philanthropist
 Eric Sinclair Traill (1905–1981), British publisher and jazz critic
 George Traill (1787–1871), Scottish politician
 Henry Duff Traill (1842–1900), British author and journalist
 James Traill (disambiguation), several people
 James Traill (bishop), Anglican bishop
 James Traill (cricketer), English cricketer and barrister
 James Hamilton Traill, Australian flying ace
 Jessie Traill (1881–1967), Australian print maker 
 John Traill (1835–1897), Scottish coffee house owner
 Johnny Traill (1882–1958), Irish-Argentine polo player
 John Christie (headmaster) (1899–1980), British teacher
 Ken Traill (1926–2002), English Rugby League footballer 
 Peter Traill, pen name of Guy Mainwaring Morton (1896–1968)
 Phil Traill (born 1973), British television and film director
 Robert Traill (Irish clergyman) (1793-1847)
 Robert Traill of Greyfriars (1603–1678), Scottish minister
 Robert Traill (Scottish minister) (1642–1716), his son
 Roy Traill (Robert Henry Traill, 1892–1989), New Zealand wildlife ranger
 Sinclair Traill (1905–1981), British publisher and music critic
 Thomas Traill (1899–1973), British World War I flying ace 
 Thomas Stewart Traill (1781–1862), Scottish physician and scholar
 William Atcheson Traill (1844–1933), Irish engineer
 William Henry Traill (1842–1902), Australian journalist and politician
 William Traill (1838–1905), English cricketer

See also 
 Trail (disambiguation)
 Traill (disambiguation)

References 

Surnames
Fife